François Naville (14 June 1883 – 3 April 1968) was a Swiss physician and director of the medico-legal Institute of the University of Geneva. He was the only truly neutral expert participating in the international Katyn Commission investigating the Soviet Katyn massacre of some 22,000 Polish prisoners of war, mostly Polish Army officers, who had been arrested and imprisoned in the course of the Soviet and German invasion of Poland. Their bodies were discovered in a series of large mass graves in the forest near Smolensk in Russia following the Nazi German Operation Barbarossa.

Katyn affair
"On April 13, 1943, the German radio announced that a common grave containing the corpses of Polish officers was found in the forest of Katyn, near Smolensk. Further enquiries showed that the dead bodies were those of officers imprisoned by the Russians in autumn 1939 and about who nobody had news since Springtime 1940. The CICR refused to deal with this problem without the agreement of the Soviets. So the Germans called together a committee of international experts to examine the grave in Katyn. Prof. Francis Naville, director of the medico-legal Institute of the University of Geneva, was the only expert really neutral in that commission. He had the merit to prove quite clearly that these criminal executions were ordered by Stalin. After the Second World War, Prof. Naville was criticised for having accepted to participate to the mission to Katyn by Jean Vincent, a deputy of the Swiss labour party (communist party) who claimed that the massacre of Katyn had been done by the Germans. Prof. Naville got no support from the CICR, who “did not want to know” who was responsible in order to avoid diplomatic complications with the Soviet Union. Only in 1989 the discovery of Prof. Naville was accepted and confirmed by the Soviet authorities."

References

1883 births
1968 deaths
20th-century Swiss physicians
Commanders of the Order of Merit of the Republic of Poland
Katyn massacre investigators